In social sciences and in information technology, trustor (alt. truster in e.g.) is an entity that trusts the other entity (the trustee). Trustor may be a social agent (such as a person or an institution) or a technical agent (such as a computer or a software application), acting on behalf of a social agent.

References

Accountability